O Papa É Pop is an album by Brazilian rock band Engenheiros do Hawaii, released in 1990. It is considered the best-selling album of the band, with more than 250,000 copies (Platinum) in its first year.

Track list 
All songs written by Humberto Gessinger, except where indicated.

Side A / Pope ("Lado Papa") 
 "O Exército de um Homem Só I (One Man Army I)" (Augusto Licks; Humberto Gessinger) – 4:51
 "Era um Garoto que, como Eu, Amava os Beatles e os Rolling Stones (There Was A Young Man Who, Just Like Me, loved the Beatles and the Rolling Stones')" (Franco Migliacci; Mauro Lusini; ver. Brancato Júnior) – 4:25
 "O Exército de um Homem Só II (One Man Army II)" (Augusto Licks; Humberto Gessinger) – 1:23
 "Nunca Mais Poder (To Never Be Able)" (Augusto Licks; Humberto Gessinger) – 4:36
 "Pra Ser Sincero (To Be Honest)" (Augusto Licks; Humberto Gessinger) – 3:11
 "Olhos Iguais aos Seus (Eyes Like Yours)" – 3:45

Side B / Pop ("Lado Pop") 
 "O Papa é Pop (The Pope Is Pop)" – 3:48
 "A Violência Travestida Faz Seu Trottoir (The Disguised Violence Makes Its Trottoir)"  – 6:53
 "Anoiteceu em Porto Alegre (Night Fell In Porto Alegre)" – 8:06
 "Ilusão de Ótica (Optical Illusion)" – 2:47
 "Perfeita Simetria (Perfect Symmetry)" (bonus-track exclusiva do CD) – 3:34

References 

1990 albums
Engenheiros do Hawaii albums